GDNF family receptor alpha like is a protein that in humans is encoded by the GFRAL gene.

References

Further reading

External links